The Airstan incident was an international incident involving Russia and the Taliban of Afghanistan in 1995 and 1996.

On 3 August 1995, Taliban-controlled fighter aircraft intercepted an Airstan Ilyushin Il-76TD transport aircraft, with seven Russian nationals on board, forcing it to land at Taliban-occupied Kandahar International Airport.  The men were held prisoner for over a year before making their escape; after overpowering their captors they re-possessed their aircraft, flying it to freedom.

Background

In 1995, Afghanistan was in a state of civil war.  In late 1994 the Taliban movement sprang out of Kandahar and by early 1995 had taken control of most of the country south of Kabul, forcing other Afghan groups to abandon territory.  In August 1995 the Russian crew of the Ilyushin Il-76 was working for Tatarstan-based Airstan, which was in turn leasing their plane to Rus Trans Avia Export, a Russian company that was based in Sharjah, United Arab Emirates.  On board the plane were Russian nationals: Vladimir Sharpatov (commander), Gazinur Khairullin (second pilot), Alexander Zdor (navigator), Askhad Abbyazov, Yuri Vshivtsev, Sergei Butuzov and Viktor Ryazanov.  They were transporting 30 tons of weapons from Albania to the besieged Afghan President Burhanuddin Rabbani.

Capture and captivity
On 3 August 1995 a Taliban air force MiG-21 aircraft forced the Russian aircraft to land at Kandahar.  Negotiations between the Russian government and the Taliban to free the men stalled for over a year and efforts by U.S. senator Hank Brown to mediate between the two parties broke down over a prisoner exchange.  The Taliban stated that they would free the airmen if the Russians released Afghans held by the Russian government.  However the Russians denied holding any Afghan citizens. Brown was able to get the Taliban to agree that the Russian crew should be allowed to maintain their aircraft. This request paved the way for their escape.

Escape

The Russians had been planning their escape for over a year.  After Hank Brown secured visits to their aircraft for the whole crew they not only did routine maintenance but secretly prepared it for flight.  On each trip the crew would be guarded by six Taliban guards but on 16 August 1996, half of the guards left the crew for afternoon prayers.  Seizing the opportunity, the Russians overpowered the remaining guards and the pilot was able to start one engine from the auxiliary power unit (itself started with a battery).  With one engine running, the remaining three could easily be started.  The aircraft, with all seven of the crew aboard, quickly taxied down the runway.  The Taliban tried to block the runway with a fire truck but the aircraft was able to take to the air, thus avoiding the obstacle. The escapees were able to quickly exit Taliban controlled airspace and charted a course to the United Arab Emirates. The crew's escape was greeted with excitement and relief by the Russians and Russian President Boris Yeltsin telephoned the crewmen to congratulate them as they flew to Russia on a Russian government aircraft.

In popular culture
In 2001 the men released a book about their ordeal called, Escape from Kandahar.
Kandahar, 2010 Russian film by director Andrei Kavun about the Russian crew and their escape.
The story of this is included in Operation Man Hunt by Damien Lewis

Current plane status 

As of November 2019, the Ilyushin Il-76TD involved in the escape, RA-76842, is still in service, but is now operated by Aviacon Zitotrans.

Bibliography
Notes

References

 - Total pages: 308

External links
Pictures of the crew's captivity
www.airliners.net – pictures of RA-76842

Aircraft hijackings
Aviation accidents and incidents in Afghanistan
Taliban attacks
Terrorist incidents in Afghanistan in 1995
1996 in Afghanistan
Airstan accidents and incidents
Accidents and incidents involving the Ilyushin Il-76
Aviation accidents and incidents in 1995
Aviation accidents and incidents in 1996
Hostage taking in Afghanistan
History of Tatarstan
1996 in the United Arab Emirates
Afghan Civil War (1992–1996)
August 1995 events in Asia
Afghanistan–Russia relations